Below is a list of dams and reservoirs in Eastern Cape, South Africa.

See also
List of dams in South Africa
List of rivers of South Africa

References 

List of South African Dams from the Department of Water Affairs and Forestry (South Africa)

Eastern Cape
Dams, Eastern Cape
Dams